The Casino Battle Royale is a professional wrestling match utilized by All Elite Wrestling (AEW), which is formatted as a modified rumble rules battle royal.  Versions for traditional tag teams (Casino Tag Team Royale) and  three-man teams - referred to by AEW as trios (Casino Trios Royale) have also been established.

The Casino Battle Royale features 21 entrants, the Casino Tag Team Royale features 10-15 tag teams (totaling 20-30 wrestlers), and the Casino Trios Royale features eight teams (totaling 24 wrestlers). 

The winner of the Casino Battle Royale receives a world championship match of their respective gender's division—either the AEW World Championship or the AEW Women's World Championship, the winner(s) of the Casino Tag Team Royale receives an AEW World Tag Team Championship match, while the Casino Trios Royale winners split a pot of $300,000.

History
The first Casino Battle Royale occurred during the pre-show of AEW's inaugural event, Double or Nothing in May 2019, and was a men's match. The winner of this first match was entered into the match to determine the inaugural holder of the AEW World Championship at All Out in August that year. The second Casino Battle Royale was a women's match and was held during the pre-show of the aforementioned All Out event. Like the first, the winner of this second iteration was entered into the match to determine the inaugural holder of the AEW Women's World Championship on the debut episode of AEW's weekly television show, Dynamite. The third Casino Battle Royale, which was a men's match, took place at the following year's All Out, held in September, and the winner received a future AEW World Championship match.

A men's tag team variation of the match, called the Casino Tag Team Royale, was first utilized at Revolution in March 2021. The winning tag team earned an AEW World Tag Team Championship match.

In December 2022, a version for three-man teams (referred to by AEW as trios) was established called the Casino Trios Royale, where the winning team would split $300,000.

Rules

Casino Battle Royale
The Casino Battle Royale is a modified rumble rules battle royal that features 21 entrants. It begins with a group of five wrestlers, and every three minutes, another group of five wrestlers enters, while the 21st and final entrant enters alone. The wrestlers are grouped based on the suit they drew from a deck of cards—spades, diamonds, clubs, or hearts—and the order of when each group enters is based on a random draw of the cards. The 21st and final entrant is the wrestler who drew the joker. The winner receives a world championship match of their respective gender's division—either the AEW World Championship or the AEW Women's World Championship.

Casino Tag Team Royale
In the Casino Tag Team Royale, it is also a rumble rules battle royal, but with 10-15 teams participating (for a total of 20-30 wrestlers).
The order of entrants is based on a lottery. Two tag teams start the match, and every 90 seconds, a new team enters. Individual eliminations occur when a wrestler has gone over the top rope and both feet hit the floor; a team is eliminated when both members of the team have been ruled out of the match. The match ends when one wrestler or team is left. The winning tag team earns an AEW World Tag Team Championship match.

Casino Trios Royale
In the Casino Trios Royale, rumble rules are implemented, but with eight teams participating (for a total of 24 wrestlers). Entry order is determined by a lottery, with two teams starting the match, and a new team entering every 90 seconds. Eliminations occur when a wrestler is thrown over the top rope with both feet hitting the floor. A team is eliminated when all three members have been ruled out of the match.  The match ends when one wrestler or team is left, with the victors splitting a $300,000 winner's purse.

Dates, venues, and winners

Men

Women

(*) - Same arena, with a name change in the time between events.

Tag Team

(*) - indicates individual winner

Trios 

(*) - indicates individual winner(s)

See also
André the Giant Memorial Battle Royal
Royal Rumble match
Honor Rumble
Gauntlet for the Gold

References 

All Elite Wrestling
Professional wrestling battle royales